Margarete Schön (born Margarethe Schippang; 7 April 1895 – 26 December 1985) was a German stage and film actress whose career spanned nearly fifty years. She is internationally recognized for her role as Kriemhild in director Fritz Lang's Die Nibelungen series of two silent fantasy films, Die Nibelungen: Siegfried and Nibelungen: Kriemhild's Revenge.

Stage career
Born in Magdeburg, Germany as Margarethe Schippang, she received private acting lessons with the theatre actor Hans Calm in Dessau. In 1912 she made her stage debut in Bad Freienwalde. Shortly thereafter, she received a commitment at the municipal theater of Bromberg (now, Bydgoszcz, in present-day Poland). From 1915 to 1918 she was part of the ensemble cast of the Deutsches Theater in Hanover, and from 1918 to 1945 she performed at the Staatstheater Berlin.

Film career
In 1919, Margarete Schön made her film debut in the Carl Wilhelm-directed Du meine Himmelskönigin. She would spend the next two years in several small roles for directors Carl Froelich, Hanna Henning, Alfred Halm, Walter Schmidthässler and her husband, director Robert Dinesen before earning a starring role in Urban Gad's 1922 drama Hanneles Himmelfahrt.

It was in the 1924 release of Fritz Lang's two-part fantasy serial Die Nibelungen that she would cement her popularity in Germany and achieve international recognition as an actress. Co-written by Lang's then-wife Thea von Harbou, the films were based on the epic poem Nibelungenlied written around AD 1200. Schön had a starring role as the vengeful Kriemhild, opposite actor Paul Richter's role as the epic hero Siegfried.

Schön made the transition to sound films with ease and her film career was prolific through the 1930s. During the Second World War she appeared in approximately ten films, but generally avoided roles in Nazi propaganda films and stayed decidedly apolitical. One exception was an uncredited bit part in Veit Harlan's 1945 nationalistic film Kolberg. One of her most popular roles of the era was the character Frau Knauer in the Helmut Weiss-directed comedy Die Feuerzangenbowle in 1944 for Terra-Filmkunst studios.
 
After the Second World War Schön continued in West German films as a popular character actress, she also worked extensively as a radio personality. From 1948 to 1950 she worked for DEFA (Deutsche Film-Aktiengesellschaft), the state-owned film studio of East Germany. She retired from acting in 1960.

Personal life

Schön was married to Danish director Robert Dinesen. In 1968, she was awarded the Bundesfilmpreis for many years of outstanding achievements in German film. She died in West Berlin in 1985, aged 90, and is buried at the Friedhof Heerstraße cemetery in Berlin-Westend.

Selected filmography

 Schirokko (1918)
 Freiheit, Gleichheit, Brüderlichkeit (1919)
 Das Tor der Freiheit (1919)
 Spiele eines Milliardärs (1919)
 The Dancer (1919, part 1, 2) - Maria Friesländer
 The Duty to Live (1919)
 Du meine Himmelskönigin (1919)
 The Loves of Käthe Keller (1919)
 Der Tempel der Liebe (1919)
 Gewalt gegen Recht (1920)
 Das große Licht (1920)
 The Golden Crown (1920) - Prinzessin Elvira
 The Women of Gnadenstein (1920) - Ruth
 Der gelbe Tod (1920, part 2)
 The Passion of Inge Krafft (1921) - Dagmar, Harry Radens Frau
 The Sleeping Volcano (1922)
 Kinder der Zeit (1922)
 Hanneles Himmelfahrt (1922) - Johanna, Hanneles Mutter
 Insulted and Humiliated (1922)
 Firnenrausch (1922)
 Die Nibelungen (1924) - Kriemhild
 Struggle for the Soil (1925) - Franz von Wulfshagen
 Wallenstein (1925, part 1)
 Our Heavenly Bodies (1925)
 Bismarck (1925, part 1)
 Lace (1926)
 A Day of Roses in August (1927) - Helene von Rudow
 Die Welt ohne Waffen (1927)
 Youthful Indiscretion (1929)
 The Youths (1929)
 Beware of Loose Women (1929)
 Der Weg durch die Nacht (1929)
 Hocuspocus (1930) - Geschworene
 The Flute Concert of Sanssouci (1930) - Princess Amalie
 The Street Song (1931) - Emma
 In the Employ of the Secret Service (1931) - Hans hustru
 Farewell Waltz (1934) - Madame Mercier
The Green Domino (1935) - Frau von Falck
 Mazurka (1935) - (uncredited)
 Victoria (1935) - Die Müllerin, Mutter Johannes'
 Arzt aus Leidenschaft (1936) - Frau Felgentreu
 Moral (1936)
 Girls in White (1936) - Maria Petrowna
 Annemarie. Die Geschichte einer jungen Liebe (1936) - Mutter Renken
 Such Great Foolishness (1937)
 The Woman at the Crossroads (1938) - Oberschwester Hermine
 The False Step (1939) - Frau von Padden
 Men Are That Way (1939) - Frau Petersen
 Her First Experience (1939) - Mother Schäfer
 Annelie (1941)
 The Dismissal (1942) - Fürstin Johanna Bismarck
 Du gehörst zu mir (1943) - Mutter Groone
 Back Then (1943) - Gast beim Abendempfang (uncredited)
 Die Feuerzangenbowle (1944) - Frau Knauer
 The Buchholz Family (1944) - Frau Reiferstein
 Marriage of Affection (1944) - Frau Reiferstein
 Kolberg (1945)
 Blum Affair (1948) - Sophie Konrad
 The Great Mandarin (1949)
 Quartet of Five (1949)
 The Blue Swords (1949) - Frau Zorn
 Semmelweis - Retter der Mütter (1950)
 Meines Vaters Pferde (1954, part 1, 2) - Schwester Berta
 Captain Wronski (1954) - Gefängnisbeamtin
 Herr über Leben und Tod (1955)
 Oberwachtmeister Borck (1955) - neugierige Zeugin

References

External links
 

1895 births
1985 deaths
German stage actresses
German film actresses
German silent film actresses
Actors from Magdeburg
Actresses from Berlin
20th-century German actresses